The Metoro Solar Power Station is a 41 megawatts solar power plant in Mozambique. The power station was developed by a consortium comprising Neoen, a French independent power producer (IPP), based in Paris, France and Electricidade de Moçambique (EDM), the Mozambican electricity utility company. Construction began in October 2020, with commercial commissioning expected in the fourth quarter of 2021.

Location
The power station is located near the town of Metoro, in Ancuabe District in Cabo Delgado Province in northeastern Mozambique.

Overview
The power station has a maximum generation capacity of 41 megawatts. It comprises 121,500 solar panels. Its output is sold directly to the Electricidade de Moçambique (EDM), for integration into the national grid, under a 25-year power purchase agreement. A new high voltage power transmission line delivers the power to an EDM substation, where the power enters the national grid.

The power station provides 68 GWh of energy annually, enough to supply 75 percent of the electricity needs of the city of Pemba, as of 2020. The project will provided 380 jobs during construction and 25 permanent jobs after commercial commissioning.

The completed solar farm was commercially commissioned in April 2022, in the presence of Filipe Nyusi, the Mozambican president.

Developers
The power station was developed by a joint venture company, which, for descriptive purposes, we will call Metoro Solar Consortium (MSC). The table below illustrates the shareholding in MSC.

Construction costs and funding
The engineering, procurement and construction contract was awarded to Efacec Power Solutions, an engineering and infrastructure developer, based in Portugal at a contract price of US$56 million (approx. €47.5 million). The table below illustrates the sources of funding for this renewable energy infrastructure development.

Other considerations
The solar farm will aid Mozambique in avoiding the emission of 49,000 tons of carbon dioxide every year. After 25 years of operation, it is expected that the ownership of the power station will revert to Electricidade de Moçambique.

See also

List of power stations in Mozambique

References

External links
 Construction works of Metoro Solar Power Plant begins with the presence of the President of Mozambique As of 29 October 2020.

Solar power stations in Mozambique
Cabo Delgado Province
2022 establishments in Mozambique
Energy infrastructure completed in 2022